Christian Peter Coulson is an English actor known for playing young Tom Marvolo Riddle in the 2002 fantasy film Harry Potter and the Chamber of Secrets.

Early life
Coulson was born in Manchester. He attended Arnold House Preparatory School in London, before attending Westminster School on an academic scholarship. He was a member of the UK's National Youth Music Theatre from 1990 to 1997, and went on to the University of Cambridge, where he received a degree in English from Clare College in 2000. While at university, he played the M.C. (Master of Ceremonies) in Cabaret, Arturo Ui in The Resistible Rise of Arturo Ui and Claire in The Maids, as well as appearing in film and television.

Career
Coulson gained worldwide attention and popularity for his role in 2002's Harry Potter and the Chamber of Secrets, in which he portrayed a 16-year-old Tom Riddle, even though Coulson was 23 years old at the time. However, in 2007, director David Yates indicated on MTV that Coulson would not reprise his role in Half-Blood Prince, since, at 29, he was by then too old.

He also wrote the lyrics and book for a rock musical called The Fallen which was performed at Bedford Modern School in 1998.

As of 2010, Coulson resides and works in New York City as an actor and director.

Filmography

Films

Television

Audio drama

Audiobooks

Theatre
Romeo and Juliet – Liverpool Playhouse, Liverpool (2002) Romeo
Journey's End – Comedy Theatre, London (2004) Raleigh
Festen – UK Tour (2006) Christian
Ghosts – Gate Theatre, London (2007) Osvald
Travesties – McCarter Theatre, New Jersey (2012) Tristan Tzara
Shakespeare in Love – Pennsylvania Shakespeare Festival, Desales University (2018) Lord Wessex
King Richard II – Pennsylvania Shakespeare Festival, Desales University (2018) King Richard
The XIXth (The Nineteenth) - The Old Globe Theatre, San Diego (2023) Neville

References

External links

 
 
 

1978 births
21st-century English male actors
Alumni of Clare College, Cambridge
English expatriates in the United States
English male film actors
English male Shakespearean actors
English male stage actors
English male television actors
English male voice actors
Living people
Male actors from Manchester
People educated at Westminster School, London